{{Speciesbox 
| image = Amblygobius sp.jpg
| taxon = Amblygobius semicinctus
| authority = (Bennett, 1833)
| synonyms = ""Gobius semicinctus Bennett, 1833 
}}Amblygobius semicinctus, the halfbarred goby , is a species of goby from family Gobiidae.

Description
The Halfbarred goby is a small fish which can reach a length of  TL. Its background body colour is greenish brown with a kind of complex pattern of red-brown longitudinal lines running along the body and spots on the head. A dark line starting from the snout passing through the eye and melt backside with the other longitudinal lines. The body is also marked with 4 to 6 vertical black bars, a dark ocellus on the first dorsal fin and on the operculum, and finally a dark spot on the superior part of the caudal fin.

Distribution & habitatAmblyeleotris semicinctus'' is found in the western Indian Ocean from the Maldives to the eastern African coast. 
It likes sandy bottom in protected and shallow lagoons and bays. It lives usually in couple in a burrow dug under a rock or a piece of coral.

Biology
This goby is an omnivorous fish which feeds by taking in mouthfuls of sand and sifting out algae, invertebrates and other organic matter. The species is monogamous.

References

External links
 

semicinctus
Fish described in 1833